TayJay A.S. is a professional wrestling tag team consisting of Tay Melo and Anna Jay A.S.. They currently perform in All Elite Wrestling (AEW), where they are both members of the Jericho Appreciation Society.

The team was originated after Jay and Melo (then known as Tay Conti) were paired for AEW Women's Tag Team Cup Tournament: The Deadly Draw, where they would become an onscreen pair despite Conti being a babyface and Anna being a member of the heel Dark Order faction. However, after all of The Dark Order turned face due to Mr. Brodie Lee's death in December 2020, the duo would become a babyface tag team, with Conti becoming an associated member of The Dark Order after Jay suffered an injury in early 2021. After quietly disbanding in early 2022, Melo and Jay would be reunited as heels in the JAS after Jay helped her partner in attacking Ruby Soho during JAS leader's Chris Jericho match against Eddie Kingston at Fyter Fest.

History

The Dark Order (2020–2022) 
On August 4, 2020, Melo, then known as Tay Conti, debuted in All Elite Wrestling, and teamed with Jay to compete in the AEW Women's Tag Team Cup Tournament: The Deadly Draw. The team defeated Nyla Rose and Ariane Andrew in the quarterfinals but lost to Ivelisse and Diamante during the semi-finals. On the August 26 episode of Dynamite, she received a contract from the stable The Dark Order to join them, the group in which Jay was a member of.

On September 9, AEW announced that Conti had officially signed with the company. From there on, the duo would often disagree on their approach to their matches, with the heel Jay trying to win by using dirty tactics while the babyface Conti would often implore her not to do so. On December 30, she and Jay defeated Britt Baker and Penelope Ford on the special episode of Dynamite and tribute to deceased leader of The Dark Order, Brodie Lee, dubbed the Brodie Lee Celebration of Life. This turned Jay and the rest of The Dark Order into babyfaces; however, on February 2021 Jay suffered a shoulder injury during training. She underwent surgery the following month, and was expected not to wrestle for 6–12 months, putting the team on hold. However, Conti would still be accompanied by Dark Order members for her matches, thus becoming an associated member of the group.

Jay returned from injury on the September 1 episode of Dynamite, saving Conti from an attack by Ford and The Bunny after Conti defeated Ford in a match. In November, Jay competed in the TBS Women's Championship Tournament, where she lost to Jamie Hayter in the first round. After months of feuding, the team of Jay and Conti defeated the team of Ford and The Bunny in a street fight on December 31 on Rampage. Jay then challenged Jade Cargill for the AEW TBS Championship in the main event of the January 21, 2022 edition of Rampage, where she was unsuccessful.

Jericho Appreciation Society (2022-present) 

Shortly thereafter, Conti would turn heel alongside her real-life boyfriend Sammy Guevara when they joined the Jericho Appreciation Society stable. Afterwards, Conti and Jay teased a breakup between them when Jay questioned Conti's actions, but on July 20, during Night 2 of Fyter Fest, Jay turned heel by attacking Ruby Soho, thus reuniting with Conti and joining the Jericho Appreciation Society. As part of her heel turn, Jay tweaked her ring name to Anna Jay A.S. as a reference to her new stable, while also being referred by her original name. Conti also tweaked her name to Tay Melo. The feud between Melo and Soho resumed on the November 30 episode of Dynamite, leading to a match at Winter Is Coming where Soho defeated Melo. The feud continued with Melo and Jay defeating Soho and Willow Nightingale on the December 28 episode of Dynamite; Soho and Nightingale however defeated Melo and Jay on the January 11, 2023 episode of Rampage in a street fight.

Championships and accomplishments 
 All Elite Wrestling
 AEW Dynamite Awards (1 time)
 Biggest WTF Moment (2022) –  vs. The Bunny and Penelope Ford in a Street Fight on New's Year Smash (December 31)}}
 Inside the Ropes
 Most Improved Wrestler (2021) – Melo
 Lucha Libre AAA Worldwide
 AAA World Mixed Tag Team Championship (1 time) – Melo, with Sammy Guevara
 Pro Wrestling Illustrated
 Ranked Melo No. 49 of the top 150 female wrestlers in the PWI Women's 150 in 2021
 Ranked Jay No. 103 of the top 150 female wrestlers in the PWI Women's 150 in 2022
 Wrestling Observer Newsletter
 Most Improved (2021) – Melo

References 

All Elite Wrestling teams and stables
Women's wrestling teams and stables